CJCQ-FM is a Canadian radio station that broadcasts an adult contemporary format at 97.9 FM in North Battleford, Saskatchewan branded as Q98. Its local sister stations are CJNB and CJHD-FM. All three are located at 1711 100th Street in North Battleford.

Owned by the Jim Pattison Group, the station signed on in 2001.

CJCQ also has a rebroadcaster operating in Meadow Lake at 104.5 FM with the callsign CJCQ-FM-1.

References

External links
Q98

North Battleford
Jcq
Jcq
Jcq
Radio stations established in 2001
2001 establishments in Saskatchewan